The Central Lüß Plateau Heathland are a nature reserve within the  Südheide Nature Park with a total area of about . They were placed under protection in 1995 and consist of three physically separate areas of land: the Misselhorn Heath (Misselhorner Heide), the Schillohsberg Heath (Heide am Schillohsberg) and the Weesener Weg Heathland (Heideflächen am Weesener Weg). The conservation agency responsible is the district of Celle.

It begins 2 km east of Hermannsburg and consists predominantly of heath. These are almost exclusively covered by the common heather (Calluna vulgaris). Only occasionally, in the wetter locations, is the cross-leaved heath (Erica tetralix) also found. bladderworts (Utricularia), an endangered genus of carnivorous plants that occur in fresh water and wet soil, are found in several, smaller, boggy or wet locations, as is the spoonleaf sundew (Drosera intermedia), another protected carnivorous plant. Other plants found here include the protected common lousewort (Pedicularis sylvatica), which is on the red list of endangered vascular plants in Germany, and the rare marsh gentian (Gentiana pneumonanthe). Cottongrass is also found very occasionally in these reserves.

It lies east of Lutterloh.

External links 
 https://web.archive.org/web/20090415194142/http://www.nlwkn.niedersachsen.de/master/C38506071_N5512611_L20_D0_I5231158 Overview and map

Lüneburg Heath
Nature reserves in Lower Saxony
Celle (district)